Femi Oke (born 30 June 1966) is a British television presenter and journalist.

Early life and education
Femi Oke was born in London, England, to Nigerian parents of the Yoruba ethnic group. She is a  graduate of Birmingham University, where she received a bachelor's degree in English literature and language.

Broadcasting career
Oke began her career at the age of 14 working as a junior reporter for the United Kingdom's first talk radio station, London Broadcasting Company. During 1993, she worked for a cable station called Wire TV; this was pre-Janet Street-Porter's L!VE TV. Oke presented several shows for the station, including the popular Soap on the Wire on a Saturday afternoon, with soap-opera expert Chris Stacey. In the early 1990s, Oke presented the BBC's flagship educational science programme Science in Action and was also a presenter of Top of the Pops. She has also worked for London Weekend Television (1995–1999), Men & Motors (1998–1999) and Carlton Television (1994–1995).

She is a former anchor for CNN International's World Weather service at the network's global headquarters in Atlanta, Georgia. She presented weather segments for the programs Your World Today and World News. She also regularly hosted Inside Africa, now fronted by Errol Barnett, a programme that looks into the economic, social and cultural affairs and trends in Africa. She joined CNN in August 1999, and worked there until 2010. 
She used to appear as a daily newscaster, contributor and interviewer on Public Radio International/WNYC's morning public radio news program, The Takeaway. Currently, she hosts The Stream on Al Jazeera English.

Public speaking

She has accepted an invitation to teach on behalf of the World Meteorological Organization in Buenos Aires, Argentina, conducted guest lectures for the University of Liberia, Emory University in Atlanta and been a guest speaker at the United Nations, addressing the World Food Programme in Rome, Italy.

Film

Oke appeared in the short film The Last Hour (2005).

References

External links
 
 The Real Femi Oke blog
 Femi Oke: "My life in the media", The Independent, 17 July 2006.
 
 The Takeaway's Official Program website

1966 births
21st-century American women
Alumni of the University of Birmingham
American people of Nigerian descent
American people of Yoruba descent
American radio journalists
American women radio journalists
American women television journalists
Black British television personalities
British television journalists
CNN people
English emigrants to the United States
English people of Nigerian descent
English people of Yoruba descent
English women journalists
Living people
Nigerian television journalists
Nigerian women journalists
Public Radio International personalities
Weather presenters
Yoruba women journalists
Yoruba women television personalities
Top of the Pops presenters